Edythe "Edie" Colton Harrison (born September 17, 1934) is an American politician who served as a member of the Virginia House of Delegates from 1980 to 1983. She lost renomination to Tom Moss in 1982 after the state's House district maps were redrawn. In 1984, she ran for United States Senate, losing to the Republican incumbent, John Warner. She was the first woman nominated for statewide office by the Virginia Democratic Party.

In 1974, Harrison worked to found the Virginia Opera Association and led a fundraising campaign to restore the Norfolk Municipal Auditorium for the company's new home, the Harrison Opera House.

References

External links
 

1934 births
20th-century American politicians
20th-century American women politicians
Candidates in the 1984 United States elections
Living people
Democratic Party members of the Virginia House of Delegates
Politicians from Norfolk, Virginia
Politicians from Detroit
Wayne State University alumni
Women state legislators in Virginia
21st-century American women